Abū 'Ubayd ibn Mas'ūd ibn 'Amr ibn 'Umayr ibn 'Awf ibn Uqda ibn Ghayra ibn Awf ibn Thaqif al-Thaqafi, or simply Abu Ubayd, was a commander in the army of the Rashidun Caliphate. He was from Ta'if in western Arabia, and belonged to the tribe Banu Thaqif.

Al-Muthanna, commander of the Muslim Arabs in al-Hira, had asked Abu Bakr and later Caliph Umar for reinforcements against Sasanians in Mesopotamia, who were fighting him back. Umar chose Abu Ubayd who volunteered first, although he was not among the Muhajirun or Ansar (the Companions of Muhammad), and dispatched him. Abu Ubayd arranged a force of 1,000 from his Thaqif tribe and increased his numbers in the way north. He took over command from al-Muthanna for the second time, becoming commander of the forces in al-Hira region. The combined Arab forces conducted raiding in the plains between al-Hira and Ctesiphon (the Sawad). The commander of the Sasanian army Rustam Farrukhzad dispatched an army under Bahman Jadhuyih to attack them. In the upcoming battle at the bank of the Euphrates river near Babylon, known as the Battle of the Bridge, a white war elephant tore Abu Ubaid from his horse with its trunk, and trampled him under its foot. The Arab forces panicked and were defeated. His brother al-Hakam and his son Jabr were also killed after him.

Abu Ubayd was also the father of the revolutionary leader al-Mukhtar al-Thaqafi, who rebelled against the Umayyads to revenge the Karbala event during the Second Fitna. Safiyah, wife of Abdullah ibn Umar, was also his daughter. Jariah, another of his daughters, was married to Umar ibn Sa'ad.

References

Generals of the Rashidun Caliphate
People of the Muslim conquest of Persia
People from Taif
634 deaths
Date of birth unknown
Banu Thaqif
Companions of the Prophet
Governors of the Rashidun Caliphate